Biskovychi is a village (selo) in Sambir Raion, Lviv Oblast, in south-west Ukraine. Biskovychi hosts the administration of Biskovychi rural hromada, one of the hromadas of Ukraine. 

The village was first mentioned in 1375. In the interwar period the village belonged to Poland and was inhabited by over 3000 people, mostly Poles.

References 

Biskovychi